Dig Him! is an album by saxophonists Gene Ammons and Sonny Stitt recorded in 1961 and originally released on the Argo label in 1961. The album was subsequently rereleased as We'll Be Together Again on the Prestige label in 1968.

Reception
The Allmusic review stated "The two tenors always brought out the best in each other, and luckily, they would get back together in the early '70s. This is high-quality bebop".

Track listing 
All compositions by Sonny Stitt except as indicated
"Red Sails in the Sunset" (Jimmy Kennedy, Hugh Williams) - 4:23
"But Not for Me" (George Gershwin, Ira Gershwin) - 4:19
"A Pair of Red Pants" - 4:39
"We'll Be Together Again" (Carl T. Fischer, Frankie Laine) - 4:36
"A Mess" - 3:19
"New Blues Up and Down" (Stitt, Gene Ammons) - 3:57
"My Foolish Heart" (Ned Washington, Victor Young) - 5:14
"Water Jug" (Frank Wess) - 2:39
"Autumn Leaves" (Joseph Kosma, Johnny Mercer, Jacques Prévert) - 4:11
"Time on My Hands" (Harold Adamson, Mack Gordon, Vincent Youmans) - 3:53

Personnel 
Gene Ammons - tenor saxophone
Sonny Stitt - tenor saxophone, alto saxophone
John Houston - piano
Buster Williams - bass
George Brown - drums

References 

1962 albums
Argo Records albums
Gene Ammons albums
Sonny Stitt albums
Prestige Records albums
Collaborative albums